Astiptodonta is a genus of prominent moths in the family Notodontidae. There are at least two described species in Astiptodonta, found in the southwestern United States and Mexico.

Species
These two species belong to the genus Astiptodonta:
 Astiptodonta aonides (Strecker, 1899)
 Astiptodonta wymola (Barnes, 1905)

References

External links

 

Notodontidae